Health care of prisoners in Australia is a major concern to prison institutions around Australia with prison populations increasing in both numbers and rate with an imprisonment rate of 187.3 per 100,000 adults.

Prisoners in Australia are generally from a disadvantaged socioeconomic background, and have higher rates of tobacco smoking, illicit drug use and alcohol consumption in comparison to the general public. The disadvantages in socioeconomic background develops into a significant disparity in health between prisoners and the general public in Australia.

Socioeconomic factors 
The lowest end of the socioeconomic group perform worse than the highest end of the socioeconomic group on almost all health measures. The prevalence of many chronic diseases are higher in lower socioeconomic groups when compared to the higher socioeconomic groups, and is a result of unhealthy lifestyles. Daily smoking is more than 3 times higher in lower socioeconomic groups at 20% than higher socioeconomic groups with 6.7%, and rates of insufficient activity also shows inequality between the two socioeconomic groups with 76% for lower socioeconomic groups and 56% for higher socioeconomic groups.

The Australian Institute of Health and Welfare states that  "On average, those in the lowest spectrum were far more likely to smoke daily. In 2013, 20% of those aged 14 and over in this group smoked daily, a rate 3 times that of people in the highest spectrum at 6.7%".

Common socioeconomic factors of prisoners in Australia that reflect onto health and well-being include cultural background, education and unemployment.

Cultural background 
The majority of prisoners in custody are born in Australia, at 81%. 3% are born in New Zealand, 2% are born in Vietnam, 2% are born in the United Kingdom and the remaining 11% from other countries. Furthermore, English is the most commonly spoken language at home for prisoners (91%), with Indigenous Australian languages (2%), Vietnamese (1%) and Arabic/Lebanese (1%) being the prevalent language spoken at home for Australian prisoners respectively.

Education 
In a report published by the Australian Institute of Health and Welfare in 2015, it is stated that less education generally results in lower income, leading less resources being available to disadvantaged socioeconomic groups for a healthy lifestyle. The Australian Institute of Health and Welfare proposes that "Education is one of the recognised social detriments to health, with lower levels of education being strongly associated with poorer health", and where the majority of prisoners reside from the lower spectrum of the socioeconomic group, are exposed to unhealthy lifestyles that lead to numerous health conditions.

Indigenous prisoners have lower levels of education in comparison to non-indigenous inmates. 20% of Indigenous inmates have completed Year 11 or 12, compared to the 31% of non-Indigenous inmates that have completed Year 11 and 12. Both Indigenous (2-4%) and non-Indigenous prisoners (6-11%) were less likely than their general community counterparts to have attained an education qualification of Year 12 or equivalent (10-26% and 13-36% respectively).

Employment 
Unemployment is considered to be a major social detriment to health, being closely related to poor psycho-social outcomes such as mental health issues.

For prison entrants in Australia, employment status is detrimental to well-being and often leads to excessive alcohol consumption, illicit drug abuse and criminal offence. Nearly half the proportion of prison entrants  prior to imprisonment are unemployed at 48 per cent, with 14 percent unable to find employment due to health conditions, disabilities and age. Furthermore, only 23% of prison dischargees are employed within 2 weeks from being released from prison. However, work satisfaction is decisive in affecting well-being, as people who do not find satisfactory employment (1 out of 5 workers) have the most prevalent detriments to health.

Medical conditions

Physical health 
There are numerous physical health conditions that arise for prisoners in Australia. As the majority of prisoners are generally from disadvantaged socioeconomic groups, they are commonly exposed to unhealthy habits such as an unbalanced diet, cigarette smoking, excessive alcohol consumption and illicit substance abuse.

Unhealthy lifestyle leads to numerous physical health conditions, and some of the most common health conditions include; asthma, arthritis, cancer and complications to oral health.

Asthma 
Asthma is a common condition in Australia, and is an inflammatory disease that affects the airways of the lungs.

Asthma is a frequent health condition among prisoners in Australia, and is frequently caused by contaminated prison conditions, such as airborne substances and inadequate health habits such as the smoking of tobacco, excessive alcohol consumption and illicit drug use. Nearly a quarter of male prisoners have been diagnosed with asthma at 22%, and over a quarter of female prisoners have been diagnosed with asthma at 31%. Asthma is also more prevalent in prisoners as age increases, with the exception of ages between 25 and 34, where asthma diagnosis rate is highest at 29.

There is no significant evidence of asthma being more prevalent in Indigenous Australians with 25% reported having been diagnosed with asthma in comparison to Non-Indigenous Australians reported at 23%.

Arthritis 
Arthritis refers to numerous medical conditions that affect the joints, and although it is more frequent as age increases, anyone from any age group can develop a case of arthritis.

Although it is one of the most common medical conditions that prisoners in Australia are diagnosed, the predominant cause of arthritis in inmates is unknown. It is instead generally determined that heredity and environmental factors both affect the likelihood of developing a type of arthritis. Just under one-fifth of female inmates are diagnosed with arthritis at 18%, and it is twice as common in female prisoners than male inmates at 9%. Non-Indigenous prisoners (12%) are more likely than Indigenous prisoners (7%) to report having had a diagnosis of arthritis.

Cancer 

Cancer is not a singular disease, but numerous diseases where cells from the body develop into invasive abnormalities. These abnormalities damage surrounding tissue, spreading and causing further bodily harm, conclusively leading to death. Numerous types of cancers are leading causes of deaths in Australia, with lung cancer, breast cancer and colorectal cancer placing in the 5 leading causes of deaths. Cancer accounts for 3 in 10 deaths in Australia.

Although influenced by factors such as family history, occupational exposure to chemicals and environment pollution, cancer is a major health risk for prisoners in Australia mainly due to their exposure to unhealthy lifestyle habits such as inactivity, poor diet, tobacco smoking and the abuse of illicit drugs.

Three per cent of prison inmates are diagnosed with a type of cancer, with older prisoners being more susceptible to the disease (9%), compared to younger inmates (1-4%).

Oral health 
Oral health is a major health concern not only to Australia, but worldwide due to its high incidence rate, with oral health complications being more prevalent in disadvantaged socioeconomic groups. Oral health is considered the foundation to overall health and wellbeing, as it affects an individuals general quality of life.

The perception of oral health is poor for Australian prison inmates, such that 9 out of 10 inmates in Australian prisons require dental treatment. Furthermore, 6 per cent of the general Australian community between the age of 15 and 64 required dental extraction, whereas 28 per cent of prison inmates between the age of 15 and 64 required an extraction.

Complications of oral health in prison inmates are a recurrent condition, and Osborn M (2003) proposes that "it is important to consider the wider social determinants of health when looking at treatment options" .

Infectious diseases 
Infectious diseases, also known as communicable diseases are passed from one animal to another. There are numerous ways the diseases are transmitted from one person to another, such as through viruses in the air and through bodily fluids. In Australian prison conditions, infectious diseases are frequently transmitted due to unsatisfactory hygiene levels, sexual intercourse and the sharing of needles (illicit drugs and tattooing).

Common cases of communicable diseases include sexually transmissible infections and Hepatitis C.

Sexually transmissible infections 
Sexually transmissible infections, also referred to as sexually transmitted diseases are infections that are passed from one person to another, frequently through sexual intercourse.

In Australian prisons, sexually transmissible infections are commonly transmitted through unprotected sex, and needle-sharing. There are 1084 notifications of sexually transmissible infections for prisoners in Australia, with three out of a hundred prison inmates diagnosed with sexually transmissible infections.

Hepatitis C 

Hepatitis C is a blood-borne disease that primarily causes inflammation to the liver, and can be passed from person to person. It considered a major global health issue, with an estimated 180 million people carrying the disease worldwide. Mokhlis (2016) states that "More than 300,000 Australians are estimated to have been exposed to Acute Hepatitis C virus (HCV), of whom around 226,700 are living with chronic infection, including 16,000 Indigenous Australians".

For prison inmates, it is most frequently transmitted by illicit drug use and by sharing unhygienic needles.

Mental health 
Mental health refers to level of emotional, psychological and social well-being. The most common symptoms of mental health disorders include insomnia, tiredness and migraines, which are generally associated with depression, anxiety disorders and psychotic disorders.

In Australian prisons, 49% of inmates are diagnosed with a mental health disorder (including illicit substance abuse and alcohol addiction). For both prison entrants and dischargees, female prisoners suffer from mental health disorders more frequently than male inmates (62% and 63% for female prisoners and 40% and 47 for male inmates).

Self-harm and suicide 
Self-harm is the intentional infliction of physical stress onto body tissue. Major risk factors for self-harm include mental health disorders and substance abuse.

Suicide rates or self-harm of inmates in custody are a major concern for prison institutions in Australia, as it is increasing in proportion of recent years. Rates of self-harm occur at 3-8 times the rate to that of the general Australian community. A quarter of prison inmates have been reported to have caused self-harm at 23 percent, which has increased by 16 percent since 2012. Furthermore, the lifetime prevalence of suicide ideation of Australian prisoners is 33.7%, and suicide attempts are 20.5%.

Pannell (2003) states that "The prevention of self-harm and suicide in prisoners depends on good interaction between the individual prisoner and prison staff".

According to Human Rights Watch, in four months from June till September 2020, three suspected suicides in western Australia's prisons raised concerns over the urgent need for better mental health services and support for prisoners with mental health conditions.

Health services 
Rates of hospitalisation due to self-harm or mental health conditions are exponentially increased post-discharge, and while Australian citizens and permanent residents have access to free or subsidised healthcare through a universal health care system (Medicare), prisoners in Australia are not granted medicare and therefore do not have access to free or subsidised healthcare.

Consequently, the deficiencies and lack of support of health-care provision for ex-prisoners commonly results in diminished and recurrence of previous health problems such as mental health conditions that are often treated (84% of ex-prisoners report an improvement of mental health) during custody. The majority of prisoners after discharge are re-offend frequently due to diminished physical, mental health, substance abuse and socioeconomic factors.

References 

Prison healthcare
Penology
Penal system in Australia